The men's marathon at the 1984 Summer Olympics in Los Angeles, California, was held on Sunday August 12, 1984. The race started at 5:00 pm local time. There were 107 competitors from 59 countries. The maximum number of athletes per nation had been set at 3 since the 1930 Olympic Congress. A total number of 78 athletes completed the race. 

The race was won by Carlos Lopes of Portugal, giving Portugal its first medal in the men's marathon, as well as its first ever gold medal at the Olympics. His time of 2:09:21 was the Olympic record for the next 24 years. Ireland also won its first men's marathon medal, with John Treacy's silver. Great Britain returned to the podium for the first time since 1964 with Charlie Spedding taking bronze.

Background
This was the 20th appearance of the event, which is one of 12 athletics events to have been held at every Summer Olympics. Returning runners from the 1980 marathon included silver medalist Gerard Nijboer of the Netherlands, sixth-place finisher Rodolfo Gómez of Mexico, ninth-place finisher (and 1972 silver and 1976 bronze medalist) Karel Lismont of Belgium, and tenth-place finisher Robert de Castella of Australia. The two-time defending champion, Waldemar Cierpinski of East Germany, was prevented from trying for a third gold by the Eastern Bloc boycott. 

The two favorites were de Castella (1981 Fukuoka winner, in world record time, and 1983 World Championships winner) and Toshihiko Seko of Japan (1981 Boston winner and 1978–1980 and 1983 Fukuoka winner). Alberto Salazar of the United States had a strong 1980 to 1982 (1980–1982 New York winner and 1982 Boston winner), but had less good results in 1983, and had finished second at the USA trials.

Botswana, the Central African Republic, Cyprus, Djibouti, Israel, Jamaica, Jordan, Oman, Qatar, the Virgin Islands, and Zaire each made their first appearance in Olympic men's marathons; the Republic of China made its first appearance as Chinese Taipei. The United States made its 19th appearance, most of any nation, having missed only the boycotted 1980 Games.

Competition format and course
As all Olympic marathons, the competition was a single race. The marathon distance of 26 miles, 385 yards was run over a point-to-point route starting at Santa Monica College and ending at the Los Angeles Memorial Coliseum.

Records
These were the standing world and Olympic records prior to the 1984 Summer Olympics.

Carlos Lopes set a new Olympic record at 2:09:21.

Schedule
All times are Pacific Daylight Time (UTC-7)

Results

See also
 1982 Men's European Championships Marathon (Athens)
 1983 Men's World Championships Marathon (Helsinki)
 1984 Men's Friendship Games Marathon (Moscow)
 1986 Men's European Championships Marathon (Stuttgart)
 1987 Men's World Championships Marathon (Rome)

References

External links
  Marathon Info

M
Marathons at the Olympics
Marathons in the United States
1984 marathons
Men's marathons
Men's events at the 1984 Summer Olympics